The 15th  Pennsylvania House of Representatives District is located in southwest Pennsylvania and has been represented by Josh Kail since 2019.

District profile
The 15th District is located in Beaver County and Washington County. It includes the following areas:

Beaver County

 Beaver
 Brighton Township
 Frankfort Springs
Georgetown
Glasgow
Greene Township
 Hanover Township
Hookstown
 Independence Township
Industry
Midland
Ohioville
 Potter Township
 Raccoon Township
Shippingport
South Beaver Township
 Vanport Township

Washington County

 Blaine Township
 Buffalo Township
Burgettstown
Canton Township
 Claysville
 Cross Creek Township
 Donegal Township
 Hanover Township
 Hopewell Township
 Independence Township
 Jefferson Township
Midway
Robinson Township
Smith Township
 West Middletown

Representatives

Recent election results

References

Government of Beaver County, Pennsylvania
Government of Washington County, Pennsylvania
15

External links
District map from the United States Census Bureau
Pennsylvania House Legislative District Maps from the Pennsylvania Redistricting Commission.  
Population Data for District 15 from the Pennsylvania Redistricting Commission.